Carl Andrew Spaatz (born Spatz; June 28, 1891 – July 14, 1974), nicknamed "Tooey", was an American World War II general. As commander of Strategic Air Forces in Europe in 1944, he successfully pressed for the bombing of the enemy's oil production facilities as a priority over other targets. He became Chief of Staff of the newly formed United States Air Force in 1947.

Early life
Carl Andrew Spatz was born on June 28, 1891, in Boyertown, Pennsylvania to Anna Amelia (née Muntz) and Charles Busch Spatz.  Spaatz had an older sister Flora (1889–1971).

In 1937 Spaatz legally added the second "a" to his surname at the request of his wife and three daughters to clarify the pronunciation of the name, as many pronounced it "spats". The second "a" was added, as it was in the European branch of his family, to draw out the sound like an "ah", similar to the "a" in "father." The name is thus correctly pronounced in American English identically to "spots".

His father was a state senator who ran a printing shop and a small newspaper, The Berks County Democrat, which he published from 1904 to 1930. While a student his son worked as a linotype operator.

Using his influence his father was able to obtain a West Point appointment for his son. It was while at West Point that Spaatz received his nickname "Tooey" because of his resemblance to another red-headed cadet named F.J. Toohey. He graduated as a second lieutenant of Infantry on June 12, 1914, ranked 97th out of a class of 107. Other graduates included numerous men who would become general officers, such as Brehon B. Somervell, Charles P. Gross, Jens A. Doe, John B. Anderson, James L. Bradley, Orlando Ward, Harold Francis Loomis, Harold R. Bull, Frank W. Milburn, Ralph Royce, Vicente Lim, and Harry C. Ingles.

Following his graduation from West Point as an infantry lieutenant he served with the 25th Infantry at Schofield Barracks, Hawaii, until his assignment to the Signal Corps Aviation School at San Diego, California, between October 13, 1915, and May 15, 1916, for pilot training. He was detailed to the Aviation Section, U.S. Signal Corps in Mexico on June 8, 1916, after earning his Junior Military Aviator rating.

Spaatz served in the First Aero Squadron, which was attached to General John J. Pershing during the Punitive Expedition. Spaatz was promoted to first lieutenant on July 1, 1916, and to captain on May 15, 1917, a few weeks after the American entry into World War I.

World War I
Following America's entry into World War I, Spaatz was sent with the American Expeditionary Forces (AEF) in command of the 31st Aero Squadron. Spaatz was appointed Officer in Charge, American Aviation School at Issoudun, France but after receiving orders to return to the United States, he saw three weeks of action during the final months of the war with the 13th Aero Squadron as a supernumerary pilot. In this brief period, Spaatz shot down three enemy planes and was awarded the Distinguished Service Cross; during the time he was promoted to the temporary rank of major on June 17, 1918.

Interwar
In early 1919, Spaatz was appointed to lead one of the three "troupes" of the U.S. Army Air Service Victory Loan Flying Circus.  His group consisted of about twenty-five officers and fifty enlisted men.  His airplanes on the tour included five JN6 Jennies, five Fokker D VIIs, four RAE SE-5s and five Spad VIIs.  The team gave promotional rides and flew aerial demonstrations across the Western and Southwestern United States from early April through mid-May 1919 to raise money to retire the World War I debt.

Spaatz served in California and Texas and became assistant department air service officer for the Western Department in July 1919. Spaatz experienced the chaotic ups and downs in rank common to Regular officers in 1920, when the National Defense Act of 1920 reorganized the military. He first reverted to his permanent rank of captain of Infantry on February 27, 1920. On July 1, when the Air Service became a combatant arm of the line, he transferred to the Air Service as a captain, then was promoted to major on the same date by virtue of a provision in the National Defense Act that allowed officers who earned their rank in service with the AEF to retain it. This made him senior to a number of officers, including Henry H. Arnold (his superior at the time), with greater longevity of service. On December 18, 1922, Spaatz was discharged when Congress set a new ceiling on the number of majors authorized for the Air Service, and reappointed as a captain, then promoted again to major on February 1, 1923.

As a major, Spaatz commanded Kelly Field, Texas, from October 5, 1920, to February 1921, served at Fort Sam Houston as air officer of the Eighth Corps Area until November 1921, and was commanding officer of the 1st Pursuit Group, first at Ellington Field, Texas, and later at Selfridge Field, Michigan, until September 24, 1924. He graduated from the Air Corps Tactical School, Langley Field, Virginia, in June 1925, and then served in the Office of the Chief of Air Corps at Washington, D.C. Later that year he testified for the defence at the court-martial of Colonel Billy Mitchell.

From January 1 to January 7, 1929, Spaatz along with fellow Air Corps officers, Captain Ira Eaker and Lieutenant Elwood Quesada, both of whom would later become senior United States Army Air Forces (USAAF) generals, established an aviation record by keeping the airplane Question Mark in the air over the Los Angeles vicinity for over 150 hours. For his efforts he was awarded the Distinguished Flying Cross.

From May 8, 1929, to October 29, 1931, Spaatz commanded the 7th Bombardment Group at Rockwell Field, California, and the 1st Bombardment Wing at March Field, California, until June 10, 1933. He then served in the Office of the Chief of Air Corps and became chief of the Training and Operations Division. In August 1935, he enrolled in the Command and General Staff School at Fort Leavenworth, Kansas, and while there was promoted to lieutenant colonel on September 16. He graduated in June 1936, and then served at Langley Field on the staff of Major General Frank M. Andrews, commander of General Headquarters Air Force, until January 1939, when he returned to the Office of the Chief of Air Corps at Washington as assistant executive officer.

On November 7, 1939, Spaatz received a temporary promotion to colonel, and during the Battle of Britain in 1940, spent several weeks in England as a special military observer. This roving assignment when combined with his Teutonic name gave rise to rumors to which he once responded by signing in at a British airbase as “Col. Carl A. Spaatz, German spy.”

In August, he was assigned in the Office of the Chief of Air Corps, and two months later was appointed assistant to the chief of Air Corps, General Arnold, with the temporary rank of brigadier general. He became chief of the Plans Division of the Air Corps in November 1940, and the following July was named chief of the air staff at Army Air Forces Headquarters.

World War II
Army Chief of Staff George Marshall named Spaatz commander of Air Force Combat Command in January 1942 and promoted him to the temporary rank of major general. In May 1942 Spaatz became commander of the Eighth Air Force and transferred its headquarters to England in July. Spaatz was placed in overall command of the USAAF in the European Theater of Operations, while retaining his Eighth Air Force command. He was promoted to the permanent rank of colonel in September 1942. He was named commander of the Allied Northwest African Air Force in February 1943, the Twelfth Air Force in March 1943, the Fifteenth Air Force, and Royal Air Forces in Italy in November 1943, and the U.S. Strategic Air Forces in Europe in January 1944. Spaatz received a temporary promotion to lieutenant general in March 1943.

As commander of Strategic Air Forces, Spaatz directed the United States portion of the strategic bombing campaign against Germany, directing the Eighth Air Force, which was then commanded by Lieutenant General Jimmy Doolittle, based in England, and the Fifteenth Air Force, which was now commanded by Lieutenant General Nathan Twining, based in Italy.

As the commander of Strategic Air Forces in Europe, Spaatz was under the direct command of General Dwight Eisenhower. In March 1944, Spaatz proposed the Oil Plan for bombing, and in June 1944 during the Operation Crossbow priority bombing of V-1 sites aimed at the UK, Spaatz advocated, and received authorization from Eisenhower for, bombing of those targets at a lower priority. Spaatz also identified that "...the chimera of one air operation that will end the war...does not exist", and advocated Tedder's plan "which retained the oil system in first position, but more clearly placed Germany's rail system in second priority", which encouraged Eisenhower to overrule Air Ministry fears that the "thrust against the oil industry" might be weakened. Spaatz's "Oil Plan" became the highest bombing priority in September 1944. After the war, Eisenhower said that Spaatz, along with General Omar Bradley, was one of the two American general officers who had contributed the most to the victory in Europe.

Spaatz received promotion to the rank of general on March 11, 1945. After VE Day he was transferred to the Pacific and assumed command of the U.S. Strategic Air Forces in the Pacific as part of the Pacific Theatre of Operations, with headquarters on Guam, in July 1945. From this command, Spaatz directed the strategic bombing of Japan, including the atomic bombings of Hiroshima and Nagasaki. Spaatz was present at Reims when the Germans surrendered to the Americans on May 7, 1945; at Berlin when they surrendered to the Soviets on May 8; and aboard the battleship  in Tokyo Bay when the Japanese surrendered on September 2. He was the only man of general rank or equivalent present at all three of these acts of surrender.

Later life
In July 1945, President Harry S. Truman nominated Spaatz for promotion to the permanent rank of general. Spaatz was appointed Commanding General of the Army Air Forces in February 1946 following Arnold's retirement. After the creation of the independent Air Force by the National Security Act of 1947 and Truman's Executive Order No. 9877, Spaatz was appointed as the first Chief of Staff of the new United States Air Force in September 1947.

Spaatz retired from the military at the rank of general on June 30, 1948, and worked for Newsweek magazine as military affairs editor until 1961. He also served on the Committee of Senior Advisors to the Air Force Chief of Staff from 1952 until his death; and was the first President of the Air Force Historical Foundation during 1953. From 1948 until 1959, he served as the first Chairman of Civil Air Patrol's National Board.  In 1954, Spaatz was appointed to the congressional advisory board set up to determine the site for the new United States Air Force Academy.

Spaatz died at the Walter Reed Medical Center in Washington D.C. on July 14, 1974 from congestive heart failure.

He was buried at the Academy's cemetery in Colorado Springs, Colorado.

Personal life
Spaatz married Ruth Harrison in 1917. Ruth was born on April 28, 1896, in Fort Riley, Kansas. She died on November 19, 1989 in Maryland. The couple had three children.

Katherine served in the Red Cross in England during World War II and later married Walter Fancourt Bell.
Rebecca married Emmet B. Gresham, Jr. (March 25, 1923 - February 25, 1954) on February 13, 1943. Following his death Rebecca married Steven P. Nagel.

Carla married Francis D. Thomas Jr. at Fort Myer on April 4, 1951.

Legacy
 Spaatz Island in Antarctica is named for Spaatz, who provided an airplane used in its discovery.
The Civil Air Patrol's highest cadet award is the General Carl A. Spaatz Award.
In 1977, Spaatz was inducted into the International Air & Space Hall of Fame.
 Since 1984 Carl Andrew Spaatz Field has been the name for Reading Regional Airport in Pennsylvania which serves Reading, Pennsylvania. It is also home to the Mid-Atlantic Air Museum.
 Carl A. Spaatz Center for Officer Education, Air University (AU) at Maxwell Air Force Base, Alabama.
Spaatz is chosen as the class exemplar for the United States Air Force Academy's Class of 2006.
National Museum of the United States Air Force is located at 1100 Spaatz Street on Wright-Patterson Air Force Base, Ohio.
 General Spaatz Boulevard is located adjacent to Sarasota-Bradenton International Airport (SRQ) in Sarasota, Florida, intersecting Tamiami Trail / US 41.
 The Outstanding Air Refueling Squadron in the USAF is annually awarded the Gen Carl A. Spaatz Trophy.
The Air Force Historical Foundation's highest recognition for individual contribution to the making of Air Force history is the General Carl "Tooey" Spaatz Award
 In 2002 he was inducted into the Airlift/Tanker Association Hall of Fame.
 A section of Pennsylvania Route 562 in Berks County from the intersection with State Route 73 in the borough of Boyertown to the intersection with State Route 662 at the township line between Amity Township and Oley Township was on June 28, 2018 named the General Carl A. Spaatz Memorial Highway in his honor.
 The General Carl Spaatz National USAAF Museum on General Spaatz Avenue in Boyertown, Pennsylvania is named after him. The museum opened on October 2, 2021.
Spaatz was portrayed by Stephen Roberts in The Court Martial of Billy Mitchell and Don Fellows in Ike: The War Years.

Awards and decorations
Source: USAF Historical Study 91: Biographical Data on Air Force General Officers, 1917–1952, Vol. II, "L-Z"

  Command pilot
  Junior Military Aviator
  Combat Observer

Spaatz also received the Collier Trophy for 1944 for "demonstrating the air power concept through employment of American aviation in the war against Germany."

Distinguished Service Cross citation
Citation
The President of the United States of America, authorized by Act of Congress, July 9, 1918, takes pleasure in presenting the Distinguished Service Cross to Major (Air Service) Carl Andrew Spatz (ASN: 0–3706), United States Army Air Service, for extraordinary heroism in action while serving with 13th Aero Squadron, U.S. Army Air Service, A.E.F., during the St. Mihiel offensive, 26 September 1918. Although he had received orders to go to the United States, Major Spatz begged for and received permission to serve with a pursuit squadron at the front. Subordinating himself to men of lower rank, he was attached to a squadron as a pilot and saw continuous and arduous service through the offensive. As a result of his efficient work he was promoted to the position of night commander. Knowing that another attack was to take place in the vicinity of Verdun, he remained on duty in order to take part. On the day of the attack west of the Meuse, while with his patrol over enemy lines, a number of enemy aircraft were encountered. In the combat that followed he succeeded in bringing down three enemy planes. In his ardor and enthusiasm he became separated from his patrol while following another enemy far beyond the lines. His gasoline giving out, he was forced to land and managed to land within friendly territory. Through these acts he became an inspiration and example to all men with whom he was associated.
General Orders: War Department, General Orders No. 123 (1918)
Action Date: 26 September 1918
Service: Air Service
Rank: Major
Company: 13th Aero Squadron
Division: American Expeditionary Forces

Dates of rank

References

External links

Generals of World War II

1891 births
1974 deaths
Aerial warfare pioneers
Chiefs of Staff of the United States Air Force
Members of the Early Birds of Aviation
National Commanders of the Civil Air Patrol
Oil campaign of World War II
United States Army Air Forces pilots of World War II
United States Military Academy alumni
United States Army Command and General Staff College alumni
Air Corps Tactical School alumni
United States Army Air Forces generals

Recipients of the Distinguished Service Cross (United States)
Recipients of the Distinguished Flying Cross (United States)
Recipients of the Distinguished Service Medal (US Army)
Recipients of the Legion of Merit
Recipients of the Air Medal

Recipients of the Croix de Guerre (France)
Honorary Knights Grand Cross of the Order of the British Empire
Grand Officiers of the Légion d'honneur
Knights of the Order of the Crown (Belgium)
Recipients of the Croix de guerre (Belgium)
Commanders with Star of the Order of Polonia Restituta
Grand Officers of the Order of Orange-Nassau
Recipients of the Order of Suvorov, 2nd class
American aviation record holders
People from Boyertown, Pennsylvania
United States Army Air Forces generals of World War II
American people of German descent
Military personnel from Pennsylvania
United States Army Infantry Branch personnel